Drenovë (Drenovo) is a former municipality in the Korçë County, southeastern Albania. At the 2015 local government reform it became a subdivision of the municipality Korçë. The population at the 2011 census was 5,581. The municipal unit consists of the villages Drenovë, Mborje, Boboshticë, Moravë, Qatrom, Ravonik, Turan and Dardhë.

Notable people
Victor Eftimiu (1889—1972), Albanian-Romanian dramaturg from Boboshticë.
Aleksander Stavre Drenova (Asdreni) (1872–1947), Albanian poet.
Eli Fara (1967-now) Albanian singer

References

Former municipalities in Korçë County
Administrative units of Korçë